This list of NHS trusts in England provides details of current and former English NHS trusts, NHS foundation trusts, acute hospital trusts, ambulance trusts, mental health trusts, and the unique Isle of Wight NHS Trust. , 217 extant trusts employed about 800,000 of the NHS's 1.2 million staff. 

NHS trusts were introduced in 1992, and their number, composition, form and naming has changed over time such that there are perhaps 1,000 distinct trust names in the literature; this list seeks to identify establishment, merger, dissolution and renaming events, and the succession of services from one name or trust to another. Sufficiently distinct names are listed on distinct rows; minimally changed names (especially X NHS Trust changed to X NHS Foundation Trust) are listed on a single row. Dates are generally as established in underlying legislation; operational start and end dates may differ.  Former trusts are listed below the current trusts. 

This list excludes community health trusts established under the National Health Service and Community Care Act 1990 and their successors, primary care trusts, for which see the list of primary care trusts in England. All such trusts were abolished on 31 March 2013.

All trusts are supervised by NHS Improvement, which replaced Monitor and the NHS Trust Development Authority in April 2016.

 for the distinct system of NHS Health Boards in Scotland, see NHS Scotland
 for the system in Northern Ireland, see Health and Social Care in Northern Ireland
 for the system in Wales, see NHS Wales  and List of NHS Wales trusts and health boards

A 
 Airedale NHS Foundation Trust, established 1 November 1991 as Airedale NHS Trust, authorised as a foundation trust on 1 June 2010.
 Alder Hey Children's NHS Foundation Trust, established 21 December 1990 as Royal Liverpool Children’s Hospital and Community Services NHS Trust, changed its name to The Royal Liverpool Children’s National Health Service Trust on 15 March 1996, authorised as a foundation trust 1 August 2008.  
 Ashford and St Peter's Hospitals NHS Foundation Trust
 Avon and Wiltshire Mental Health Partnership NHS Trust

B 
 Barking, Havering and Redbridge University Hospitals NHS Trust
 Barnet, Enfield and Haringey Mental Health NHS Trust
 Barnsley Hospital NHS Foundation Trust
 Barts Health NHS Trust
 Bedfordshire Hospitals NHS Foundation Trust was formed on 1 April 2020 from the acquisition by Luton and Dunstable Hospital NHS Foundation Trust of Bedford Hospital NHS Trust
 Berkshire Healthcare NHS Foundation Trust
 Birmingham and Solihull Mental Health NHS Foundation Trust
 Birmingham Community Healthcare NHS Foundation Trust
 Birmingham Women's and Children's NHS Foundation Trust
 Black Country Partnership NHS Foundation Trust
 Blackpool Teaching Hospitals NHS Foundation Trust
 Bolton NHS Foundation Trust
 Bradford District Care NHS Foundation Trust
 Bradford Teaching Hospitals NHS Foundation Trust
 Bridgewater Community Healthcare
 Buckinghamshire Healthcare NHS Trust

C 
 Calderdale and Huddersfield NHS Foundation Trust
 Cambridge University Hospitals NHS Foundation Trust
 Cambridgeshire and Peterborough NHS Foundation Trust
 Cambridgeshire Community Services NHS Trust
 Camden and Islington NHS Foundation Trust
 Central and North West London NHS Foundation Trust
 Central London Community Healthcare NHS Trust
 Chelsea and Westminster Hospital NHS Foundation Trust
 Cheshire and Wirral Partnership NHS Foundation Trust
 Chesterfield Royal Hospital NHS Foundation Trust
 The Christie NHS Foundation Trust
 Clatterbridge Cancer Centre NHS Foundation Trust
 Cornwall Partnership NHS Foundation Trust
 County Durham and Darlington NHS Foundation Trust
 Countess of Chester Hospital NHS Foundation Trust
 Coventry and Warwickshire Partnership NHS Trust
 Croydon Health Services NHS Trust, established 22 January 1993 as Mayday Healthcare NHS Trust, adopted its current name on 1 October 2010.

D 
 Dartford and Gravesham NHS Trust
 Derbyshire Community Health Services NHS Trust
 Derbyshire Healthcare NHS Foundation Trust
 Devon Partnership NHS Trust
 Doncaster and Bassetlaw Teaching Hospitals NHS Foundation Trust
 Dorset County Hospital NHS Foundation Trust
 Dorset HealthCare University NHS Foundation Trust
 Dudley and Walsall Mental Health Partnership NHS Trust
 Dudley Group NHS Foundation Trust

E 
 East and North Hertfordshire NHS Trust
 East Cheshire NHS Trust
 East Kent Hospitals University NHS Foundation Trust
 East Lancashire Hospitals NHS Trust
 East London NHS Foundation Trust
 East Midlands Ambulance Service NHS Trust
 East of England Ambulance Service NHS Trust
 East Suffolk and North Essex NHS Foundation Trust was created by a merger of Colchester Hospital University NHS Foundation Trust and Ipswich Hospital NHS Trust in 2018
 East Sussex Healthcare NHS Trust
 Enfield Primary Care NHS Trust
 Epsom and St Helier University Hospitals NHS Trust
 Essex Partnership University NHS Foundation Trust created 2017 by merger between South Essex Partnership University NHS Foundation Trust and North Essex Partnership University NHS Foundation Trust.

F 
 Frimley Health NHS Foundation Trust

G 
 Gateshead Health NHS Foundation Trust
 George Eliot Hospital NHS Trust, Warwickshire
 Gloucestershire Health and Care NHS Foundation Trust formed by merger of 2gether NHS Foundation Trust and Gloucestershire Care Services NHS Trust in October 2019
 Gloucestershire Hospitals NHS Foundation Trust
 Great Ormond Street Hospital for Children NHS Foundation Trust
  Great Western Hospitals NHS Foundation Trust
 Guy's and St Thomas' NHS Foundation Trust

H 
 Hampshire Hospitals NHS Foundation Trust 
 Harrogate and District NHS Foundation Trust
 Hertfordshire Community NHS Trust
 Hertfordshire Partnership University NHS Foundation Trust
 Hillingdon Hospitals NHS Foundation Trust
 Homerton University Hospital NHS Foundation Trust
 Hounslow and Richmond Community Healthcare NHS Trust
 Hull University Teaching Hospitals NHS Trust
 Humber NHS Foundation Trust

I 
 Imperial College Healthcare NHS Trust
 Isle of Wight NHS Trust

J 
 James Paget University Hospitals NHS Foundation Trust

K 
 Kent and Medway NHS and Social Care Partnership Trust
 Kent Community Health NHS Foundation Trust
 Kettering General Hospital NHS Foundation Trust
 King's College Hospital NHS Foundation Trust
 Kingston Hospital NHS Foundation Trust

L 
 Lancashire Teaching Hospitals NHS Foundation Trust
 Lancashire and South Cumbria NHS Foundation Trust, formerly known as Lancashire Care NHS Foundation Trust
 Leeds and York Partnership NHS Foundation Trust
 Leeds Community Healthcare NHS Trust
 Leeds Teaching Hospitals NHS Trust
 Leicestershire Partnership NHS Trust
 Lewisham and Greenwich NHS Trust
 Lincolnshire Community Health Services
 Lincolnshire Partnership NHS Foundation Trust
 Liverpool Community Health NHS Trust
 Liverpool Heart and Chest Hospital NHS Foundation Trust
 Liverpool University Hospitals NHS Foundation Trust formed by merger of Royal Liverpool and Broadgreen University Hospitals NHS Trust  and Aintree University Hospitals NHS Foundation Trust in October 2019
 Liverpool Women's NHS Foundation Trust
 London Ambulance Service NHS Trust
 London North West University Healthcare NHS Trust, formerly the London North West Healthcare NHS Trust

M 
 Maidstone and Tunbridge Wells NHS Trust
 Manchester University NHS Foundation Trust formed by merger of Central Manchester University Hospitals NHS Foundation Trust and University Hospital of South Manchester NHS Foundation Trust in 2017
 Medway NHS Foundation Trust
 Mersey Care NHS Foundation Trust
 Mid and South Essex NHS Foundation Trust
 Mid Cheshire Hospitals NHS Foundation Trust
 Mid Yorkshire Hospitals NHS Trust
 Midlands Partnership NHS Foundation Trust was formed by a merger of Staffordshire and Stoke-on-Trent Partnership NHS Trust and South Staffordshire and Shropshire Healthcare NHS Foundation Trust in 2018
 Milton Keynes University Hospital NHS Foundation Trust
 Moorfields Eye Hospital NHS Foundation Trust

N 
 Newcastle upon Tyne Hospitals NHS Foundation Trust
 Norfolk and Norwich University Hospitals NHS Foundation Trust
 Norfolk and Suffolk NHS Foundation Trust
 Norfolk Community Health and Care NHS Trust
 North Bristol NHS Trust
 North Cumbria Integrated Care NHS Foundation Trust created in October 2019 by a merger between Cumbria Partnership NHS Foundation Trust and North Cumbria University Hospitals NHS Trust
  North East Ambulance Service NHS Foundation Trust
 North East London NHS Foundation Trust
 North Middlesex University Hospital NHS Trust
 North Staffordshire Combined Healthcare NHS Trust
 North Tees and Hartlepool NHS Foundation Trust
  North West Ambulance Service NHS Trust
 North West Anglia NHS Foundation Trust formed from the acquisition by Peterborough and Stamford Hospitals NHS Foundation Trust of Hinchingbrooke Health Care NHS Trust in 2017
 North West Boroughs Healthcare NHS Foundation Trust, from 1 April 2017 the new name of 5 Boroughs Partnership NHS Foundation Trust. Services in Wigan, Bolton and Greater Manchester transferred to Greater Manchester Mental Health NHS Foundation Trust in April 2021. Cheshire and Merseyside services merged into Mersey Care NHS Foundation Trust from June 2021.  
 Northampton General Hospital NHS Trust
 Northamptonshire Healthcare NHS Foundation Trust
 Northern Care Alliance NHS Group, created by merger of Salford Royal NHS Foundation Trust and The Pennine Acute Hospitals NHS Trust in 2021
 Northern Lincolnshire and Goole Hospitals NHS Foundation Trust
 Northumberland, Tyne and Wear NHS Foundation Trust
 Northumbria Healthcare NHS Foundation Trust
 Nottingham University Hospitals NHS Trust
 Nottinghamshire Healthcare NHS Foundation Trust

O 
 Oxford Health NHS Foundation Trust
 Oxford University Hospitals NHS Foundation Trust
 Oxleas NHS Foundation Trust

P 
 Pennine Care NHS Foundation Trust
 Portsmouth Hospitals NHS Trust
 The Princess Alexandra Hospital NHS Trust

Q 
 Queen Elizabeth Hospital, King’s Lynn, NHS Foundation Trust
  Queen Victoria Hospital NHS Foundation Trust

R 
 Robert Jones and Agnes Hunt Orthopaedic Hospital NHS Foundation Trust
 Rotherham Doncaster and South Humber NHS Foundation Trust
 Rotherham NHS Foundation Trust
 Royal Berkshire NHS Foundation Trust
 Royal Brompton and Harefield NHS Foundation Trust
 Royal Devon University Healthcare NHS Foundation Trust 
 Royal Free London NHS Foundation Trust
 Royal Marsden NHS Foundation Trust
 Royal National Orthopaedic Hospital NHS Trust
 Royal Orthopaedic Hospital NHS Foundation Trust
 Royal Papworth Hospital NHS Foundation Trust
 Royal Surrey County Hospital NHS Foundation Trust
 Royal United Hospitals Bath NHS Foundation Trust
 Royal Wolverhampton Hospitals NHS Trust

S 
 Salisbury NHS Foundation Trust
 Sandwell and West Birmingham Hospitals NHS Trust
 Sheffield Children's NHS Foundation Trust
 Sheffield Health and Social Care NHS Foundation Trust
 Sheffield Teaching Hospitals NHS Foundation Trust
 Sherwood Forest Hospitals NHS Foundation Trust
 Shrewsbury and Telford Hospital NHS Trust
 Shropshire Community Health NHS Trust established 2011
 Solent NHS Trust
 Somerset NHS Foundation Trust
  South Central Ambulance Service NHS Foundation Trust
  South East Coast Ambulance Service NHS Foundation Trust
 South London and Maudsley NHS Foundation Trust
 South Staffordshire Healthcare NHS Trust, established 19 January 2001, authorised as South Staffordshire and Shropshire Healthcare NHS Foundation Trust on 1 May 2006, and renamed South Staffordshire and Shropshire Healthcare NHS Foundation Trust on 1 June 2007 after integration of services from Shropshire. 
 South Tees Hospitals NHS Foundation Trust
 South Tyneside and Sunderland NHS Foundation Trust formed by merger of City Hospitals Sunderland NHS Foundation Trust and South Tyneside NHS Foundation Trust in April 2019
 South Warwickshire NHS Foundation Trust
 South West London and St George's Mental Health NHS Trust
 South West Yorkshire Partnership NHS Foundation Trust
 South Western Ambulance Service NHS Foundation Trust
 Southern Health NHS Foundation Trust
 Southport and Ormskirk Hospital NHS Trust
 St George's University Hospitals NHS Foundation Trust
 St Helens and Knowsley Teaching Hospitals NHS Trust
 Stockport NHS Foundation Trust
 Surrey and Borders Partnership NHS Foundation Trust
 Surrey and Sussex Healthcare NHS Trust
 Sussex Community NHS Trust
 Sussex Partnership NHS Trust

T 
 Tavistock and Portman NHS Foundation Trust
 Tees, Esk and Wear Valleys NHS Trust
 Torbay and South Devon NHS Foundation Trust

U 
 United Lincolnshire Hospitals NHS Trust
 University College London Hospitals NHS Foundation Trust
 University Hospitals Coventry and Warwickshire NHS Trust
 University Hospitals Birmingham NHS Foundation Trust
 University Hospitals Bristol and Weston NHS Foundation Trust
 University Hospitals Dorset NHS Foundation Trust
 University Hospitals of Derby and Burton NHS Foundation Trust
  University Hospitals of Leicester NHS Trust
 University Hospitals of Morecambe Bay NHS Foundation Trust
 University Hospitals of North Midlands NHS Trust
 University Hospitals Plymouth NHS Trust
 University Hospital Southampton NHS Foundation Trust
 University Hospitals Sussex NHS Foundation Trust

W 
 Walsall Healthcare NHS Trust
  Walton Centre NHS Foundation Trust
 Warrington and Halton Hospitals NHS Foundation Trust
 West Hertfordshire Hospitals NHS Trust
 West Midlands Ambulance Service University NHS Foundation Trust
 West Suffolk NHS Foundation Trust
 The Whittington Hospital NHS Trust
 Wirral Community NHS Trust
 Wirral University Teaching Hospital NHS Foundation Trust
 Worcestershire Acute Hospitals NHS Trust
 Worcestershire Health and Care NHS Trust
 Wrightington, Wigan and Leigh NHS Foundation Trust
 Wye Valley NHS Trust

Y 

 Yeovil District Hospital NHS Foundation Trust
 York and Scarborough Teaching Hospitals NHS Foundation Trust
 Yorkshire Ambulance Service NHS Trust

Former NHS trusts

0-9
 2gether NHS Foundation Trust, established as Gloucestershire Partnership NHS Trust on 1 April 2002, acquired Gloucestershire Care Services NHS Trust on 1 October 2019, becoming Gloucestershire Health and Care NHS Foundation Trust.
 5 Boroughs Partnership NHS Trust was established on 1 April 2002, and authorised as a foundation trust in or after 2009, becoming 5 Boroughs Partnership NHS Foundation Trust. It changed its name to North West Boroughs Healthcare NHS Foundation Trust on 1 April 2017 after widening its activities outside the 5 boroughs from which it took its name.

A
 Addenbrooke's NHS Trust, established 4 November 1992, was authorised as a foundation trust and renamed Cambridge University Hospitals NHS Foundation Trust on 1 July 2004
Aintree Hospitals NHS Trust, established 1 November 1991, was authorised as a foundation trust and renamed Aintree University Hospitals NHS Foundation Trust on 1 August 2006. It merged with Royal Liverpool and Broadgreen University Hospitals NHS Trust to form Liverpool University Hospitals NHS Foundation Trust on 1 October 2019.
 Alexandra Healthcare NHS Trust established 8 February 1994, dissolved 1 April 2000 and replaced by the Worcestershire Acute Hospitals NHS Trust.
 Allington NHS Trust, established 1 November 1991, merged into Local Health Partnerships NHS Trust on 1 April 1999.
 Andover District Community Health Care NHS Trust, established 4 November 1992, dissolved 1 April 2000, replaced by Winchester and Eastleigh Healthcare NHS Trust.
 Anglian Harbours NHS Trust, Yarmouth, established 1990, dissolved 1997
 Ascot University Hospitals NHS Foundation Trust
 Ashford Hospital NHS Trust merged into Ashford and St Peter's Hospitals NHS Trust in 1998
 Ashton, Leigh and Wigan Community Healthcare NHS Trust changed its name to Bridgewater Community Healthcare NHS Trust in 2011
 Avalon, Somerset, NHS Trust changed its name to Somerset Partnership National Health Service and Social Care Trust in 1999
 Avon Ambulance Service NHS trust merged into Great Western Ambulance Service NHS Trust in 2006
 Aylesbury Vale Community Healthcare NHS Trust merged into Buckinghamshire Mental Health NHS Trust in 2001

B
 Barnet and Chase Farm NHS Hospitals Trust acquired by Royal Free London NHS Foundation Trust in July 2014.
 Barnet Community Health Care NHS Trust merged into Barnet, Enfield and Haringey Mental Health NHS Trust 2001
 Barnsley Community & Priority Services NHS Trust dissolved 2002
 Barts and The London NHS Trust merged into Barts Health NHS Trust in 2012
 Bethlem and Maudsley NHS Trust merged into South London and Maudsley NHS Trust in 1999
 Bexley Community Health NHS Trust changed its name to Oxleas NHS Trust in 1995
 BHB Community NHS Trust merged into North East London NHS Trust in 2000
 Barts NHS Trust merged into Royal Hospital of St. Bartholomew, the Royal London Hospital, Whipps Cross Hospital and London Chest Hospital NHS Trust in 1994
 Basildon and Thurrock University Hospitals NHS Foundation Trust merged into Mid and South Essex NHS Foundation Trust on 1 April 2020
 Basingstoke and North Hampshire NHS Foundation Trust merged into Hampshire Hospitals NHS Foundation Trust in 2012
 Bassetlaw Hospital & Community Services NHS Trust merged into Doncaster and Bassetlaw Hospitals NHS Trust in 2000
 Bath and West Community NHS Trust dissolved 2001
 Bath Mental Health Care NHS Trust changed its name to Avon and Wiltshire Mental Health Partnership NHS Trust in 1999.
 Bay Community NHS Trust, Morecambe, dissolved 2001
 Bedford and Shires Health and Care NHS Trust merged into Bedfordshire & Luton Community NHS Trust in 1999
 Bedford Hospital NHS Trust was acquired by Luton and Dunstable Hospital NHS Foundation Trust, forming Bedfordshire Hospitals NHS Foundation Trust on 1 April 2020
 Bedfordshire and Hertfordshire Ambulance and Paramedic Service NHS Trust merged into East of England Ambulance Service NHS Trust in 2006
 Bedfordshire & Luton Community NHS Trust changed its name to Bedfordshire and Luton Mental Health and Social Care Partnership NHS Trust in 2005
 Bedfordshire and Luton Mental Health and Social Care Partnership NHS Trust was taken over by South Essex Partnership University NHS Foundation Trust in 2010
 Birmingham Children's Hospital NHS Foundation Trust merged into Birmingham Women's and Children's NHS Foundation Trust in 2017
 Birmingham Heartlands & Solihull NHS Trust became Heart of England NHS Foundation Trust in 2005
 Birmingham Heartlands Hospital NHS Trust merged into Birmingham Heartlands & Solihull NHS Trust in 1996
 Birmingham Specialist Community NHS Trust merged into Birmingham Community Healthcare NHS Trust 2002
 Birmingham Women's NHS Foundation Trust merged into Birmingham Women's and Children's NHS Foundation Trust in 2017
 Bishop Auckland Hospitals NHS Trust merged into South Durham NHS Trust in 1998
 Black Country Mental Health NHS Trust changed its name to Sandwell Mental Health National Health Service and Social Care Trust in 2003
 Blackburn Hyndburn and Ribble Valley Health Care NHS Trust merged into East Lancashire Hospitals NHS Trust in 2011
 Blackpool, Fylde and Wyre Hospitals NHS Trust became Blackpool Teaching Hospitals NHS Foundation Trust in 2007
 Blackpool Victoria Hospital NHS Trust merged into Blackpool, Fylde and Wyre Hospitals NHS Trust in 2002
 Blackpool, Wyre and Fylde Community Health Services NHS Trust merged into Blackpool, Fylde and Wyre Hospitals NHS Trust in 2002
 Bolton, Salford and Trafford Mental Health NHS Trust became Greater Manchester West Mental Health NHS Foundation Trust in 2008
 Bournewood Community and Mental Health Services Trust changed its name to North West Surrey Mental Health National Health Service Partnership Trust in 2002
 Bradford Community Health NHS Trust merged into Bradford District Care NHS Foundation Trust in 2002
 Brent, Kensington & Chelsea and Westminster Mental Health NHS Trust merged into Central and North West London NHS Trust in 2002
 Brighton and Sussex University Hospitals NHS Trust merged into University Hospitals Sussex NHS Foundation Trust in 2021
 Brighton Health Care NHS Trust merged into Brighton and Sussex University Hospitals NHS Trust
 Broadgreen Hospital NHS Trust merged into Royal Liverpool and Broadgreen University Hospitals NHS Trust in 1994
 Bromley Hospitals NHS Trust merged into South London Healthcare NHS Trust in 2009
 Buckinghamshire Hospitals NHS Trust changed its name to Buckinghamshire Healthcare NHS Trust in 2010
 Buckinghamshire Mental Health NHS Trust merged into Oxfordshire and Buckinghamshire Mental Health Partnership NHS Trust in 2006
 Burnley Health Care NHS Trust merged into East Lancashire Hospitals NHS Trust in 2011
 Burton Hospitals NHS Foundation Trust merged into University Hospitals of Derby and Burton NHS Foundation Trust in 2018
 Bury Health Care NHS Trust merged into Pennine Acute Hospitals NHS Trust in 2002

C
 Calderdale Healthcare NHS Trust merged into Calderdale and Huddersfield NHS Trust in 2001
 Calderstones Partnership NHS Foundation Trust  taken over by Mersey Care NHS Trust in 2016
 Canterbury and Thanet Community Healthcare NHS Trust changed its name to East Kent National Health Service and Social Care Partnership Trust in 2003
 Cardiothoracic Centre Liverpool NHS Trust changed its name to Liverpool Heart and Chest Hospital NHS Foundation Trust in 2008
 Carlisle Hospitals NHS Trust merged into North Cumbria Acute Hospitals NHS Trust in 2001
 Central Manchester Healthcare NHS Trust merged into Central Manchester and Manchester Children's University Hospitals NHS Trust in 2001
 Central Manchester University Hospitals NHS Foundation Trust merged into Manchester University NHS Foundation Trust 2017
 Central Middlesex Hospital NHS Trust merged into North West London Hospitals NHS Trust in 1999
 Central Nottinghamshire Healthcare NHS Trust dissolved 2001
 Central Sheffield University Hospitals NHS Trust merged into Sheffield Teaching Hospitals NHS Trust in 2001
 Chase Farm Hospitals NHS Trust merged into Barnet and Chase Farm NHS Hospitals Trust in 1999
 Cheshire Community Healthcare NHS Trust dissolved 2002
 Chester and Halton Community NHS Trust, established 21 December 1990, dissolved 1 April 2002.
 Chesterfield and North Derbyshire Royal Hospital trust became Chesterfield Royal Hospital NHS Foundation Trust in 2005
 Cheviot and Wansbeck NHS Trust merged into Northumbria Healthcare NHS Trust in 1998
 Chichester Priority Care Services NHS Trust changed its name to Sussex Weald and Downs NHS Trust in 1998
 Chorley & South Ribble NHS Trust merged into Lancashire Teaching Hospitals NHS Trust in 2002
 Churchill John Radcliffe NHS Trust changed its name to Oxford Radcliffe Hospital NHS Trust in 1994
 City and Hackney Community Services NHS Trust dissolved 2001
 City Hospital NHS Trust merged into Sandwell and West Birmingham Hospitals NHS Trust in 2002
 City Hospitals Sunderland NHS Foundation Trust merged into South Tyneside and Sunderland NHS Foundation Trust in April 2019
 Cleveland Ambulance NHS Trust merged into Tees, East and North Yorkshire Ambulance Service NHS Trust in 1999
 Colchester Hospital University NHS Foundation Trust merged into East Suffolk and North Essex NHS Foundation Trust in 2018
 CommuniCare NHS Trust, Accrington, dissolved 2002
 Community Healthcare Bolton NHS Trust dissolved 2002
 Community Health Care Service (North Derbyshire) NHS Trust was taken over by North Eastern Derbyshire Primary Care Trust in 2002
 Community Health Care: North Durham NHS Trust merged into North Durham Health Care NHS Trust in 1998
 Community Health Services, Southern Derbyshire NHS Trust merged into Derbyshire Mental Health Services NHS Trust in 2002
 Community Health Sheffield NHS Trust changed its name to Sheffield Care Trust in 2003
 Community Health South London NHS Trust dissolved 2002
 Cornwall and Isles of Scilly Mental Handicap NHS Trust, established 21 December 1990, changed its name to Cornwall and Isles of Scilly Learning Disabilities NHS Trust on 24 April 1993, and to Trecare NHS Trust on 18 July 1996; it was dissolved on 1 April 1999.
 Cornwall Community Healthcare NHS Trust, established 21 December 1990, dissolved 1 April 1993, its functions merged into Cornwall Healthcare NHS Trust.
 Cornwall Healthcare NHS Trust changed its name to Cornwall Partnership NHS Trust in 2002
 County Durham and Darlington Priority Services NHS Trust merged into Tees, Esk and Wear Valleys NHS Trust 2006
 Coventry and Warwickshire Ambulance NHS Trust merged with West Midlands Ambulance Service NHS Foundation Trust in 2006
 Coventry Healthcare NHS Trust dissolved 2002
 Crawley Horsham NHS Trust merged into Surrey and Sussex Healthcare NHS Trust in 1998
 Croydon Community NHS Trust, established 21 December 1990, changed its name to Croydon and Surrey Downs Community NHS Trust on 1 February 2000, and was dissolved on 1 April 2002 and replaced by Mayday Healthcare NHS Trust.
 Croydon and Surrey Downs Community NHS Trust, from 1 February 2000 the new name of Croydon Community NHS Trust, was dissolved on 1 April 2002 and replaced by Mayday Healthcare NHS Trust.
 Cumbria Ambulance Service NHS Trust merged into North West Ambulance Service NHS Trust in 2006
 Cumbria Partnership NHS Foundation Trust merged into North Cumbria Integrated Care NHS Foundation Trust in October 2019

D
 Dacorum and St Albans Community NHS Trust dissolved 1994
 Darlington Memorial Hospital NHS Trust merged into South Durham Health Care NHS Trust in 1998
 Derby City General Hospital NHS Trust merged into Southern Derbyshire Acute Hospitals NHS Trust in 1998
 Derby Hospitals NHS Foundation Trust merged into University Hospitals of Derby and Burton NHS Foundation Trust in 2018
 Derbyshire Ambulance Service NHS Trust merged into East Midlands Ambulance Service NHS Trust in 2006
 Derbyshire Mental Health Services NHS Trust became Derbyshire Healthcare NHS Foundation Trust in 2011
 Derbyshire Royal Infirmary NHS Trust merged into Southern Derbyshire Acute Hospitals NHS Trust in 1998
 Devon Ambulance Service NHS Trust merged into Westcountry Ambulance Services NHS Trust in 1993
 Dewsbury Health Care NHS Trust merged into Mid Yorkshire Hospitals NHS Trust in 2002
 Doncaster Healthcare NHS Trust changed its name to  Doncaster and South Humber Healthcare NHS Trust in 1999
 Doncaster Royal Infirmary and Montagu Hospital NHS Trust became Doncaster and Bassetlaw Hospitals NHS Foundation Trust in 2004
 Doncaster & South Humber Healthcare NHS Trust merged into Rotherham Doncaster and South Humber NHS Foundation Trust in 2007
 Dorset Ambulance NHS Trust merged into South Western Ambulance Service NHS Trust in 2006
 Dorset Community NHS Trust dissolved 2001
 Dudley Priority Health NHS Trust dissolved 2002
 Durham County Ambulance Service NHS Trust merged into North East Ambulance Service NHS Trust in 2006
 Durham County Priority Services NHS Trust changed its name to County Durham and Darlington Priority Services NHS Trust in 1999

E
 Ealing Hospital NHS Trust merged into London North West Healthcare NHS Trust in 2014
 Ealing, Hammersmith & Fulham Mental Health NHS Trust merged into West London Mental Health NHS Trust in 2001
 East Anglian Ambulance NHS Trust  merged into East of England Ambulance Service NHS Trust in 2006
 East Berkshire Community NHS Trust dissolved 2002
 East Berkshire National Health Service Trust for People with Learning Disabilities merged into Berkshire Healthcare NHS Trust in 2000
 East Birmingham Hospital NHS Trust changed its name to Birmingham Heartlands Hospital NHS Trust in 1993
 East Gloucestershire NHS Trust merged into Gloucestershire Hospitals NHS Foundation Trust in 2002
 East Hertfordshire Health NHS Trust merged into East and North Hertfordshire NHS Trust in 2000
 East Kent Community NHS Trust changed its name to East Kent National Health Service and Social Care Partnership Trust in 2003
 East Kent National Health Service and Social Care Partnership Trust merged into Kent and Medway National Health Service and Social Care Partnership Trust in 2006
 East London and The City Mental Health NHS Trust became East London NHS Foundation Trust in 2000
 East Somerset NHS Trust became Yeovil District Hospital NHS Foundation Trust
 East Suffolk Local Health Services NHS Trust merged into Local Health Partnerships NHS Trust 1999
 East Surrey Healthcare NHS Trust merged into Surrey and Sussex Healthcare NHS Trust in 1998
 East Surrey Hospital and Community Healthcare NHS Trust changed its name to East Surrey Healthcare NHS Trust in 1995
 East Surrey Learning Disability and Mental Health Service NHS Trust changed its name to East Surrey Priority Care NHS Trust in 1995
 East Surrey Priority Care NHS Trust merged into Surrey and Sussex Healthcare NHS Trust 1998
 East Sussex County NHS Trust merged into Sussex Partnership NHS Trust in 2006
 East Sussex Hospitals NHS Trust changed its name to East Sussex Healthcare NHS Trust in 2011
 East Wiltshire Healthcare NHS Trust  merged into Wiltshire & Swindon Health Care NHS Trust in 1999
 East Yorkshire Community Healthcare NHS Trust Hull & East Riding Community Health NHS Trust in 1999
 East Yorkshire Hospitals NHS Trust merged into Hull and East Yorkshire Hospitals NHS Trust in 1999
 Eastbourne & County Healthcare NHS Trust changed its name to  East Sussex County NHS Trust in 2002
 Eastbourne Hospitals NHS trust merged into East Sussex Hospitals NHS Trust in 2002
 Eastern and Coastal Kent Community Health NHS Trust changed its name to Kent Community Health NHS Trust in 2011
 Enfield Community Care NHS Trust merged into Barnet, Enfield and Haringey Mental Health NHS Trust 2001
 Epsom Health Care merged into Epsom and St Helier University Hospitals NHS Trust in 1999
 Essex Ambulance Service NHS Trust merged into East of England Ambulance Service NHS Trust in 2006
 Essex and Hertfordshire Community NHS Trust dissolved 2001
 Essex Rivers Healthcare NHS Trust became Colchester Hospital University NHS Foundation Trust in 2008
 Exeter & District Community Health Services NHS Trust dissolved 2001

F
 First Community NHS Trust, established 21 December 1990, was dissolved 1 April 2001, replaced by South Staffordshire Healthcare NHS trust.
 Forest Healthcare Community NHS Trust merged into North East London NHS Trust in 2000
 Fosse Health, Leicestershire Community NHS trust merged into Leicestershire and Rutland Healthcare NHS Trust in 1998
 Foundation NHS Trust, Mid Staffordshire, merged into South Staffordshire Healthcare NHS Trust 2001
 Freeman Group of Hospitals NHS Trust merged into Newcastle upon Tyne Hospitals NHS Foundation Trust in 1998
 Frenchay Healthcare NHS Trust merged into North Bristol NHS Trust in 1999
 Frimley Park Hospital NHS Foundation Trust  became Frimley Health NHS Foundation Trust in October 2014
 Furness Hospitals NHS Trust merged into Morecambe Bay Hospitals NHS Trust in 1998

G
 Gateshead Community Health NHS Trust became Gateshead Healthcare NHS Trust in 1994
 Gateshead Healthcare NHS Trust dissolved 1998
 Glenfield Hospital NHS Trust merged into University Hospitals of Leicester NHS Trust in 1999
 Gloucestershire Ambulance Services NHS Trust merged into Great Western Ambulance Service NHS Trust in 2006
 Gloucestershire Care Services NHS Trust merged into Gloucestershire Health and Care NHS Foundation Trust in October 2019
 Gloucestershire Partnership NHS Trust, established 1 April 2002 became 2gether NHS Foundation Trust in 2007
 Gloucestershire Royal NHS Trust merged into Gloucestershire Hospitals NHS Foundation Trust in 2002
 Good Hope Hospital NHS Trust merged into Heart of England NHS Foundation Trust in 2007
 Grantham and District Hospital NHS Trust merged into United Lincolnshire Hospitals NHS Trust in 2000
 Great Western Ambulance Service NHS Trust merged with South Western Ambulance Service NHS Trust in 2013
 Greater Manchester Ambulance Services NHS Trust merged into North West Ambulance Service NHS Trust in 2006
 Greater Manchester West Mental Health NHS Foundation Trust became Greater Manchester Mental Health NHS Foundation Trust in 2017
 Greenwich Healthcare NHS Trust changed its name to Queen Elizabeth Hospital NHS Trust in 2001
 Grimsby Health NHS Trust changed its name to North East Lincolnshire NHS Trust in 1996
 Guild Community Healthcare NHS Trust merged into Lancashire Care NHS Trust in 2000
 Guy’s and Lewisham NHS Trust was divided between Lewisham Hospital NHS Trust and Guy's and St Thomas' NHS Foundation Trust in 1993

H
 Halton General Hospital NHS Trust merged into North Cheshire Hospitals NHS Trust in 2001
 Hammersmith Hospitals NHS Trust merged into Imperial College Healthcare NHS Trust in 2007
 Hampshire Ambulance Service NHS Trust merged into South Central Ambulance Service NHS Trust in 2006
 Hampshire Partnership NHS Foundation Trust merged into Southern Health NHS Foundation Trust in 2011
 Harefield Hospital NHS Trust merged into Royal Brompton and Harefield NHS Foundation Trust in 1998
 Haringey Healthcare NHS Trust merged into Barnet, Enfield and Haringey Mental Health NHS Trust 2001
 Harrow and Hillingdon Healthcare Trust merged into Central and North West London NHS Foundation Trust in 2002
 Harrow Community Health Services NHS Trust merged into Harrow and Hillingdon Healthcare Trust 1994
 Hartlepool and East Durham NHS Trust merged into North Tees and Hartlepool NHS Foundation Trust in 1999
 Hartlepool and Peterlee Hospitals NHS Trust merged into Hartlepool and East Durham NHS Trust 1996
 Hartlepool Community Care NHS Trust merged into Hartlepool and East Durham NHS Trust 1996
 Hastings and Rother NHS Trust merged into East Sussex Hospitals NHS Trust in 2002
 Havering Hospitals NHS Trust merged into Barking, Havering and Redbridge University Hospitals NHS Trust in 2000
 Heart of England NHS Foundation Trust  merged with University Hospitals Birmingham NHS Foundation Trust in 2018
 Heatherwood and Wexham Park Hospitals NHS Foundation Trust was taken over by Frimley Health NHS Foundation Trust October 2014 
 Heathlands Mental Health NHS trust merged into Surrey Hampshire Borders NHS Trust in 1998
 Hereford and Worcester Ambulance Service NHS Trust merged with West Midlands Ambulance Service NHS Foundation Trust in 2006
 Hereford Hospitals NHS Trust changed its name to Wye Valley NHS Trust in 2011
 Herefordshire Community Health NHS Trust dissolved 2000
 Hillingdon Community Health NHS trust merged into Harrow and Hillingdon Healthcare Trust 1994
 Hinchingbrooke Health Care NHS Trust managed by Circle Health from 2010; franchise ended in 2015, with management returned to the NHS; acquired by Peterborough and Stamford Hospitals NHS Foundation Trust, forming North West Anglia NHS Foundation Trust in 2017
 Homewood NHS Trust merged into Bournewood Community and Mental Health Services Trust 1995
 Horizon NHS Trust, Hertfordshire, dissolved 2001
 Horton General Hospital NHS Trust merged into Oxford Radcliffe Hospitals NHS Trust in 1998
 Hounslow and Spelthorne Community and Mental Health NHS Trust joined West London Mental Health NHS Trust in 2002
 Huddersfield Health Care Services NHS Trust merged into Calderdale and Huddersfield NHS Trust in 2001
 Hull & East Riding Community Health NHS Trust changed its name to Humber Mental Health Teaching NHS Trust in 2005
 Hull and East Yorkshire Hospitals NHS Trust changed its name to Hull University Teaching Hospitals NHS Trust in March 2019
 Hull and Holderness Community Health NHS Trust merged into Hull & East Riding Community Health NHS Trust in 1999
 Humber Mental Health Teaching NHS Trust became Humber NHS Foundation Trust in 2010
 Humberside Ambulance Service NHS Trust split into Tees, East and North Yorkshire Ambulance Service NHS Trust (North Humberside) and Lincolnshire Ambulance Service NHS Trust (South Humberside) in 1999

I
 Invicta Community Care NHS Trust merged into West Kent National Health Service and Social Care Trust in 2002
 Ipswich Hospital NHS Trust merged into East Suffolk and North Essex NHS Foundation Trust in 2018
 Isle of Wight Community Healthcare NHS Trust merged into Isle of Wight Primary Care Trust in 2006

K
 Kent and Canterbury Hospitals NHS Trust merged into East Kent Hospitals NHS Trust in 1999
 Kent Ambulance Trust merged into South East Coast Ambulance Service NHS Trust in 2006
 Kent and Sussex Weald NHS Trust merged into Maidstone and Tunbridge Wells NHS Trust in 2000
 Kent Community Health NHS Trust became Kent Community Health NHS Foundation Trust in March 2015
 Kidderminster Health Care NHS Trust merged with Worcestershire Acute Hospitals NHS Trust in 1999
 King's Lynn & Wisbech Hospitals NHS Trust  became Queen Elizabeth Hospital King's Lynn NHS Trust in 2005
 Kings Mill Centre for Health Care Services NHS Trust changed its name to Sherwood Forest Hospitals NHS Trust in 2001
 Kingston and District Community NHS Trust dissolved 2001

L
 Lambeth Healthcare NHS Trust merged into South London and Maudsley NHS Trust in 1999
 Lancashire Ambulance Service NHS Trust merged into North West Ambulance Service NHS Trust in 2006
 Lancashire Care NHS Foundation Trust merged into Lancashire and South Cumbria NHS Foundation Trust in 2019
 Lancaster Acute Hospitals NHS Trust merged into Morecambe Bay Hospitals NHS Trust in 1998
 Lancaster Priority Services NHS Trust merged into Bay Community NHS Trust in 1998
 Leeds Community and Mental Health Services Teaching NHS Trust became Leeds and York Partnership NHS Foundation Trust in 2007
 Leeds General Infirmary and Associated Hospitals NHS Trust changed its name to United Leeds Teaching Hospitals NHS Trust in 1991 
 Leeds Partnerships NHS Foundation Trust changed its name to Leeds and York Partnership NHS Foundation Trust in 2011
 Leicester General Hospital NHS Trust merged into University Hospitals of Leicester NHS Trust in 1999
 Leicester Royal Infirmary NHS trust merged into University Hospitals of Leicester NHS Trust in 1999
 Leicestershire Ambulance and Paramedic Service NHS Trust merged into East Midlands Ambulance Service NHS Trust in 2006
 Leicestershire & Rutland Healthcare NHS Trust changed its name to Leicestershire Partnership NHS Trust in 2002
 Leicestershire Mental Health Service NHS Trust merged into Leicestershire and Rutland Healthcare NHS Trust in 1998
 Lewisham and Guy’s Mental Health NHS Trust merged into South London and Maudsley NHS Trust in 1999
 Lewisham Healthcare NHS Trust merged into Lewisham and Greenwich NHS Trust in 2014
 Lifecare NHS Trust, established 21 December 1990, dissolved 1 April 1999.
 Lifespan Cambridge NHS Trust merged into Cambridgeshire and Peterborough Mental Health Partnership in 2002
 Lincoln and Louth NHS Trust merged into United Lincolnshire Hospitals NHS Trust in 2000
 Lincoln District Healthcare NHS Trust merged into Lincolnshire Healthcare NHS Trust in 2001
 Lincoln Hospitals NHS Trust changed its name to Lincoln and Louth NHS Trust in 1996
 Lincolnshire Ambulance and Health Transport Service NHS Trust merged into East Midlands Ambulance Service NHS Trust in 2006
 Lincolnshire Healthcare NHS Trust changed its name to Lincolnshire Partnership NHS Trust in 2002
 Liverpool Obstetric and Gynaecology Services NHS trust changed its name to Liverpool Women’s Hospital NHS Trust in 1994
 Local Health Partnerships NHS Trust changed its name to Suffolk Mental Health Partnership NHS Trust in 2004
 Louth and District Healthcare NHS Trust merged into Lincoln and Louth NHS Trust in 1996
 Luton and Dunstable Hospital NHS Foundation Trust acquired Bedford Hospital NHS Trust, forming Bedfordshire Hospitals NHS Foundation Trust on 1 April 2020

M
 Maidstone Priority Care NHS trust merged into Invicta Community Care NHS Trust in 1997
 Manchester Central Hospitals and Community Care NHS Trust changed its name to  Central Manchester Healthcare NHS Trust in 1993
 Manchester Children's Hospital NHS Trust merged into Central Manchester and Manchester Children's University Hospitals Trust in 2001
 Manchester Mental Health and Social Care Trust taken over by Greater Manchester West Mental Health NHS Foundation Trust 2016
 Mancunian Community Health NHS Trust dissolved 2001 and divided between three Manchester primary care trusts
 Mayday Healthcare NHS, established 22 January 1993, changed its name to Croydon Health Services NHS Trust on 1 October 2010.
 Medway Community Healthcare is now classified as an Independent provider and not an NHS trust
 Mental Health Foundation of Mid Staffordshire NHS Trust changed its name to Foundation NHS Trust in 1993
 Mental Health Services of Salford NHS Trust merged into Bolton, Salford and Trafford Mental Health NHS Trust in 2003
 Mersey Regional Ambulance Service NHS Trust merged into North West Ambulance Service NHS Trust in 2006
 Merton and Sutton Community NHS Trust merged into South West London Community NHS Trust in 1999
 Mid Anglia Community Health NHS Trust merged into Local Health Partnerships NHS Trust 1999
 Mid Essex Community & Mental Health NHS Trust dissolved 2001
 Mid Essex Community Health NHS Trust was dissolved in 1993 into the Mid Essex Community & Mental Health NHS Trust
 Mid Essex Hospital Services NHS Trust merged into Mid and South Essex NHS Foundation Trust on 1 April 2020
 Mid Kent Healthcare NHS Trust merged into Maidstone and Tunbridge Wells NHS Trust in 2000
 Mid Staffordshire NHS Foundation Trust dissolved 2014
 Mid Sussex NHS Trust merged into Brighton and Sussex University Hospitals NHS Trust in 2002
 Milton Keynes Community Health NHS trust dissolved 2000
 Morecambe Bay Hospitals NHS Trust became University Hospitals of Morecambe Bay NHS Trust in 2005
 Mount Vernon & Watford Hospitals NHS Trust merged into West Hertfordshire Hospitals NHS Trust in 2000
 Mulberry NHS trust merged into Lincoln District Healthcare NHS Trust 1999

N
 New Possibilities NHS Trust dissolved 2002
 Newcastle City Health NHS Trust merged into Newcastle, North Tyneside and Northumberland Mental Health NHS trust in 2001
 Newcastle Mental Health Trust merged into Newcastle City Health NHS Trust in 1994
 Newcastle, North Tyneside and Northumberland Mental Health NHS trust  merged into Northumberland, Tyne and Wear NHS Trust in 2006
 Newham Community Health Services NHS Trust dissolved 2001
 Newham University Hospital NHS Trust merged with Barts Health NHS Trust 2012
 NHS Direct NHS Trust was closed in 2014
 Norfolk Ambulance NHS Trust merged into East Anglian Ambulance NHS Trust in 1993
 Norfolk and Waveney Mental Health Partnership NHS Trust merged with Suffolk Mental Health Partnership NHS Trust in 2012 to form Norfolk and Suffolk NHS Foundation Trust
 Norfolk Mental Health Care NHS Trust changed its name to Norfolk and Waveney Mental Health Partnership NHS Trust in 2004
 North and East Devon Partnership NHS Trust changed its name to Devon Partnership NHS Trust in 2002
 North Cheshire Hospitals NHS trust became Warrington and Halton Hospitals NHS Foundation Trust in 2008
 North Cumbria Acute Hospitals NHS Trust is now called North Cumbria University Hospitals NHS Trust
 North Cumbria University Hospitals NHS Trust acquired by Cumbria Partnership NHS Foundation Trust, becoming North Cumbria Integrated Care NHS Foundation Trust in October 2019
 North Downs Community Health NHS Trust merged into Surrey Hampshire Borders NHS Trust in 1998
 North Durham Acute Hospitals NHS Trust dissolved 1998
 North Durham Health Care NHS Trust merged into County Durham and Darlington NHS Trust 2002
 North East Essex Mental Health NHS Trust dissolved 2001
 North East Lincolnshire NHS Trust dissolved 2001
 North East Worcestershire Community HealthCare NHS Trust merged into Worcestershire Community Healthcare NHS Trust 1996
 North Essex Partnership University NHS Foundation Trust merged into Essex Partnership University NHS Foundation Trust in 2017
 North Hampshire Hospitals NHS Trust became Basingstoke and North Hampshire NHS Foundation Trust in 2006
 North Hampshire Loddon Community NHS Trust dissolved 2001
 North Hertfordshire NHS Trust merged into East and North Hertfordshire NHS Trust in 2000
 North Kent Healthcare NHS Trust merged into Thames Gateway NHS Trust in 1998
 North Lakeland Healthcare NHS Trust merged into North Cumbria Acute Hospitals NHS Trust in 2001
 North Manchester Healthcare NHS Trust merged into Pennine Acute Hospitals NHS Trust in 2002, but from 2020 North Manchester General Hospital is managed by Manchester University NHS Foundation Trust
 North Mersey Community NHS Trust dissolved 2002
 North Sefton & West Lancashire Community NHS Trust merged into Lancashire Care NHS Trust in 2000
 North Staffordshire Hospital Centre NHS Trust changed its name to North Staffordshire Hospital NHS Trust in 1993 and again to University Hospital of North Staffordshire NHS Trust in 2003
 North Tees NHS Trust merged into North Tees and Hartlepool NHS Trust in 1999
 North Tyneside Health Care NHS Trust merged into Northumbria Health Care National Health Service Trust in 1998
 North Warwickshire NHS Trust dissolved 2002
 North West Anglia Healthcare NHS Trust merged into Cambridgeshire and Peterborough Mental Health Partnership in 2002
 North West London Hospitals NHS Trust merged into London North West Healthcare NHS Trust in 2014
 North West London Mental Health NHS Trust merged into Brent, Kensington & Chelsea and Westminster Mental Health NHS Trust 1998
 North West Surrey Mental Health National Health Service Partnership Trust merged into Surrey and Borders Partnership NHS Trust in 2005
 North Yorkshire Ambulance Service NHS Trust merged into Tees, East and North Yorkshire Ambulance Service NHS Trust in 1999
 Northallerton Health Services NHS Trust dissolved 2002
 Northampton Community Healthcare NHS Trust dissolved 2001
 Northern Birmingham Community Health NHS Trust merged into Birmingham Specialist Community NHS Trust in 1999
 Northern Birmingham Mental Health Trust merged into Birmingham and Solihull Mental Health NHS Trust in 2003
 Northern Devon Healthcare NHS Trust merged with Royal Devon and Exeter NHS Foundation Trust in April 2022 to form Royal Devon University Healthcare NHS Foundation Trust
 Northern General Hospital NHS Trust merged into Sheffield Teaching Hospitals NHS Foundation Trust in 2001
 Northgate and Prudhoe NHS Trust  merged into Northumberland, Tyne and Wear NHS Trust in 2006
 Northgate NHS trust merged into Northgate and Prudhoe NHS Trust 1994
 Northumberland Community Health NHS Trust merged into Northumbria Healthcare NHS Trust in 1998
 Northumberland Mental Health NHS Trust merged into Newcastle, North Tyneside and Northumberland Mental Health NHS trust in 2001
 Northumbria Ambulance Service NHS Trust merged into North East Ambulance Service NHS Trust in 2006
 Norwich Community Health Partnership NHS Trust dissolved 2001
 Northwick Park and St. Mark’s NHS Trust merged into North West London Hospitals NHS Trust in 1999
 Northwick Park Hospital NHS Trust was renamed Northwick Park and St. Mark’s NHS Trust in 1994
 Nottingham City Hospital NHS Trust merged into Nottingham University Hospitals NHS Trust in 2006
 Nottingham Community Health NHS Trust
 Nottingham Healthcare NHS Trust dissolved 2001
 Nottinghamshire Ambulance Service NHS Trust merged into East Midlands Ambulance Service NHS Trust in 2006
 Nottinghamshire Healthcare NHS Trust became Nottinghamshire Healthcare NHS Foundation Trust in March 2015
 Nuffield Orthopaedic Centre NHS Trust merged into Oxford University Hospitals NHS Trust in 2011

O
 Oldham NHS Trust merged into Pennine Acute Hospitals NHS Trust in 2002
 Optimum Health Services NHS Trust merged into South London and Maudsley NHS Trust in 1999
 Oxford Radcliffe Hospitals NHS Trust changed its name to Oxford University Hospitals NHS Trust in 2011
 Oxfordshire Ambulance NHS Trust merged into South Central Ambulance Service NHS Trust in 2006
 Oxfordshire and Buckinghamshire Mental Health Partnership NHS Trust became Oxford Health NHS Foundation Trust in 2008
 Oxfordshire Community Health NHS Trust dissolved 2001
 Oxfordshire Learning Disability NHS Trust merged with Southern Health NHS Foundation Trust in 2012
 Oxfordshire Mental Healthcare NHS Trust changed its name to Oxfordshire and Buckinghamshire Mental Health Partnership NHS Trust in 2006

P
 Parkside Health NHS Trust, Westminster, dissolved 2002
 Pathfinder NHS trust changed its name to South West London and St George's Mental Health NHS Trust in 1999
 Pennine Acute Hospitals NHS Trust became part of Northern Care Alliance NHS Group in 2017
 Peterborough and Stamford Hospitals NHS Foundation Trust acquired Hinchingbrooke Hospital NHS Trust, forming North West Anglia NHS Foundation Trust in 2017
 Peterborough Hospitals NHS Trust became Peterborough and Stamford Hospitals NHS Foundation Trust in 2004
 Phoenix NHS Trust dissolved 2000
 Pilgrim Health NHS Trust merged into United Lincolnshire Hospitals NHS Trust in 2000
 Pinderfields & Pontefract NHS Trust merged into Mid Yorkshire Hospitals NHS Trust in 2002 
 Pinderfields Hospitals NHS Trust merged into Pinderfields & Pontefract NHS Trust in 1997
 Plymouth Community Services NHS Trust dissolved 2001
 Plymouth Hospitals NHS Trust renamed as University Hospitals Plymouth NHS Trust 2018
 Pontefract Hospitals NHS Trust merged into Pinderfields & Pontefract NHS Trust in 1997
 Poole Hospital NHS Foundation Trust merged into University Hospitals Dorset NHS Foundation Trust in 2020
 Portsmouth Healthcare NHS Trust dissolved 2002
 Premier Health NHS Trust merged into South Staffordshire Healthcare NHS Trust 2001
 Preston Acute Hospitals NHS Trust merged into Lancashire Teaching Hospitals NHS Trust in 2002
 Princess Royal Hospital NHS Trust merged into Shrewsbury and Telford Hospital NHS Trust in 2004
 Priority Health Care, Wearside NHS Trust merged into  South of Tyne and Wearside Mental Health NHS Trust in 2002

Q
 Queen Elizabeth Hospital NHS Trust merged into South London Healthcare NHS Trust in 2009
 Queen’s Medical Centre, Nottingham, University Hospital NHS Trust merged into Nottingham University Hospitals NHS Trust in 2006
 Queen Mary's Sidcup NHS Trust merged into South London Healthcare NHS Trust in 2009

R
 Radcliffe Infirmary NHS Trust became Oxford Radcliffe Hospitals NHS Trust in 1999
 Ravensbourne Priority Health NHS trust dissolved 2001 and transferred to Bromley Primary Care Trust
 Redbridge Healthcare NHS Trust merged into Barking, Havering and Redbridge University Hospitals NHS Trust in 2000
 Richmond, Twickenham and Roehampton Healthcare NHS Trust merged into merged into South West London Community NHS Trust in 1999
 Riverside Community Healthcare NHS Trust, Fulham, dissolved 2002
 Riverside Mental Health NHS Trust merged into Brent, Kensington & Chelsea and Westminster Mental Health NHS Trust 1998
 Rochdale Healthcare NHS Trust merged into Pennine Acute Hospitals NHS Trust in 2002
 Rockingham Forest NHS Trust dissolved 2001 became Northamptonshire Healthcare NHS Foundation Trust
 Rotherham Priority Health Service NHS Trust dissolved 2002
 Royal Berkshire Ambulance NHS Trust merged into South Central Ambulance Service NHS Trust in 2006
 The Royal Bournemouth and Christchurch Hospitals NHS Foundation Trust merged into University Hospitals Dorset NHS Foundation Trust in 2020
 Royal Brompton Hospital NHS Trust merged into Royal Brompton and Harefield NHS Trust in 1998
 Royal Cornwall Hospitals and West Cornwall Hospital changed its name to Royal Cornwall Hospitals NHS Trust in 1992
 Royal Devon and Exeter NHS Foundation Trust merged with Northern Devon Healthcare NHS Trust in April 2022 to form Royal Devon University Healthcare NHS Foundation Trust
 Royal Hospital of St. Bartholomew, the Royal London Hospital and London Chest Hospital NHS Trust changed its name to Barts and The London NHS Trust in 1999
 Royal Hull Hospitals NHS Trust merged into Hull and East Yorkshire Hospitals NHS Trust in 1999
 Royal Liverpool and Broadgreen University Hospitals NHS Trust merged into Liverpool University Hospitals NHS Foundation Trust in October 2019
 Royal Liverpool Children's NHS Trust became Alder Hey Children's NHS Foundation Trust in 2008
 Royal Liverpool NHS Trust merged into Royal Liverpool and Broadgreen University Hospitals NHS Trust in 1994
 Royal London Homoeopathic Hospital NHS Trust merged with Parkside Health NHS Trust in 2002
 Royal London Hospital and Associated Community Services NHS Trust merged into Royal Hospital of St. Bartholomew, the Royal London Hospital and London Chest Hospital NHS Trust in 1994
 Royal Manchester Children's Hospital Trust merged with Central Manchester and Manchester Children's University Hospitals NHS Foundation Trust in 2009
 Royal National Hospital for Rheumatic Diseases NHS Foundation Trust merged into Royal United Hospital Bath NHS Foundation Trust in 2015.
 Royal National Throat, Nose and Ear Hospital NHS Trust dissolved 1996 and became part of the Royal Free London NHS Foundation Trust
 Royal Shrewsbury Hospitals NHS Trust merged into Shrewsbury and Telford Hospital NHS Trust in 2004
 Royal Surrey County & St Lukes Hospital NHS Trust changed its name to Royal Surrey County Hospital NHS Foundation Trust in 1996
 Royal United Hospital Bath NHS Trust became Royal United Hospital Bath NHS Foundation Trust in 2014
 Royal Victoria Infirmary and Associated Hospitals NHS trust became part of Newcastle upon Tyne Hospitals NHS Foundation Trust in 1998
 Royal West Sussex NHS Trust  merged into Western Sussex Hospitals NHS Foundation Trust in 2009
 Rugby NHS Trust merged into North Warwickshire NHS Trust in 1998

S
 Salford Community Health Care NHS Trust dissolved 2001
 Salford Royal NHS Foundation Trust became part of Northern Care Alliance NHS Group in 2017
 Sandwell Healthcare NHS Trust merged into Sandwell and West Birmingham Hospitals NHS Trust in 2002
 Sandwell Mental Health National Health Service and Social Care Trust
 Scarborough and North East Yorkshire NHS Trust merged with York Teaching Hospital NHS Foundation Trust 2012
 Scunthorpe & Goole Hospitals NHS Trust dissolved 2001
 Scunthorpe Community Health Care NHS Trust was abolished 1999
 Severn NHS Trust merged into Gloucestershire Hospitals NHS Foundation Trust in 2002
 Sheffield Care Trust became Sheffield Health and Social Care NHS Foundation Trust in 2008
 Shropshire Community and Mental Health Services NHS Trust dissolved 2002
 Shropshire Mental Health NHS Trust merged into Shropshire Community and Mental Health Services NHS Trust in 1998
 Solihull Healthcare NHS Trust dissolved 2001
 Somerset Partnership NHS Foundation Trust merged into Somerset NHS Foundation Trust in 2020
 South Bedfordshire Community Health Care NHS Trust merged into Bedfordshire & Luton Community NHS Trust in 1999
 South Birmingham Community Health NHS Trust changed its name to Southern Birmingham Community NHS Trust in 1994
 South Birmingham Mental Health NHS Trust merged into Birmingham and Solihull Mental Health NHS Trust in 2003
 South Buckinghamshire NHS Trust merged into Buckinghamshire Hospitals NHS Trust 2002
 South Cumbria Community and Mental Health NHS Trust merged into Bay Community NHS Trust in 1998
 South Devon Healthcare NHS Foundation Trust merged into Torbay and South Devon NHS Foundation Trust in October 2015
 South Downs Health NHS Trust merged into Sussex Community NHS Trust in 2010
 South Durham Health Care NHS Trust merged into South Durham NHS Trust 1996
 South Durham NHS Trust merged into County Durham and Darlington NHS Trust 2002
 South East London Mental Health NHS Trust changed its name to Lewisham and Guy’s Mental Health NHS Trust on 1994
 South Essex Mental Health and Community Care NHS Trust became South Essex Partnership University NHS Trust in 2006
 South Essex Partnership University NHS Foundation Trust merged into Essex Partnership University NHS Foundation Trust in 2017
 South Kent Community Healthcare NHS Trust merged into Canterbury and Thanet Community Healthcare NHS Trust in 1998
 South Kent Hospitals NHS Trust merged into East Kent Hospitals NHS Trust in 1999
 South Lincolnshire Community and Mental Health Services NHS Trust merged into Lincolnshire Healthcare NHS Trust in 2001
 South London Healthcare NHS Trust dissolved 1 October 2013
 South Manchester University Hospital Trust became University Hospital of South Manchester NHS Foundation Trust in 2006
 South of Tyne and Wearside Mental Health NHS Trust merged into Northumberland, Tyne and Wear NHS Trust in 2006
 South Staffordshire and Shropshire Healthcare NHS Foundation Trust, formed as South Staffordshire Healthcare NHS Trust on 19 January 2001, merged with Staffordshire and Stoke on Trent Partnership NHS Trust to form Midlands Partnership NHS Foundation Trust on 1 June 2018
 South Tees Community and Mental Health NHS Trust dissolved 1999
 South Tyneside NHS Foundation Trust merged into South Tyneside and Sunderland NHS Foundation Trust in April 2019
 South Warwickshire Combined Healthcare NHS Trust dissolved 2002
 South Warwickshire Health Care NHS Trust merged into South Warwickshire Combined Healthcare NHS Trust in 1998
 South Warwickshire Mental Health NHS Trust merged into South Warwickshire Combined Healthcare NHS Trust in 1998
 South West Durham Mental Health NHS Trust merged into South Durham NHS Trust 1996
 South West London Community NHS Trust dissolved 2002
 South West Yorkshire Mental Health NHS Trust became South West Yorkshire Partnership NHS Foundation Trust in 2009
 South Worcestershire Community NHS Trust merged into Worcestershire Community Healthcare NHS Trust 1996
 South Yorkshire Metropolitan Ambulance and Paramedic Service NHS Trust merged into Yorkshire Ambulance Service NHS Trust in 2006
 Southend Community Care Services NHS trust merged into South Essex Mental Health and Community Care NHS Trust in 2000
 Southend University Hospital NHS Foundation Trust merged into Mid and South Essex NHS Foundation Trust on 1 April 2020
 Southern Birmingham Community Health NHS Trust merged into Birmingham Specialist Community NHS Trust in 1999
 Southern Derbyshire Acute Hospitals NHS Trust became Derby Hospitals NHS Foundation Trust in 2004
 Southern Derbyshire Community and Mental Health Services NHS Trust changed its name to Derbyshire Mental Health Services NHS Trust in 2002
 Southampton Community Health Service NHS Trust dissolved 2002
 Southampton University Hospitals NHS Trust became University Hospital Southampton NHS Foundation Trust in 2011
 Southmead Health Services NHS Trust merged into North Bristol NHS Trust in 1999
 Southport and Formby Community Health Services NHS Trust merged into Sefton and Lancashire Community NHS Trust in 1999
 Southport and Formby NHS Trust merged into Southport and Ormskirk Hospital NHS Trust in 1999
 St Albans & Hemel Hempstead NHS Trust merged into West Hertfordshire Hospitals NHS Trust in 2000
 St George's Healthcare NHS Trust became St George's University Hospitals NHS Foundation Trust in February 2015
 St Helens & Knowsley Community Health NHS Trust dissolved 2002
 St. Helier NHS Trust merged into Epsom and St Helier University Hospitals NHS Trust in 1999
 St. James’s and Seacroft University Hospitals NHS Trust merged into Leeds Teaching Hospitals NHS Trust in 1998
 St Mary's Hospital NHS Trust merged into Imperial College Healthcare NHS Trust in 2007
 St Peter's Hospital NHS Trust merged with Ashford Hospital NHS Trust in 1998
 St Thomas' Hospital NHS Trust merged into Guy's and St Thomas' NHS Foundation Trust in 1993
 Staffordshire Ambulance Service NHS Trust merged with West Midlands Ambulance Service NHS Foundation Trust in 2007
 Staffordshire and Stoke-on-Trent Partnership NHS Trust merged with South Staffordshire and Shropshire Healthcare NHS Foundation Trust in 2018 to form Midlands Partnership NHS Foundation Trust
 Stockport Acute Services NHS Trust merged into Stockport NHS Trust 2000
 Stockport Healthcare NHS Trust merged into Stockport NHS Trust 2000
 Stoke Mandeville Hospital NHS Trust merged into Buckinghamshire Hospitals NHS Trust 2002
 Suffolk Mental Health Partnership NHS Trust merged with Norfolk and Waveney Mental Health Partnership NHS Trust in 2012 to form Norfolk and Suffolk NHS Foundation Trust
 Surrey Ambulance Service NHS Trust merged into South East Coast Ambulance Service NHS Trust in 2006
 Surrey Hampshire Borders NHS Trust merged into Surrey and Borders Partnership NHS Trust in 2005
 Surrey Heartlands NHS Trust merged into Surrey Oaklands NHS Trust in 1998
 Surrey Oaklands NHS Trust merged into Surrey and Borders Partnership NHS Trust in 2005
 Sussex Ambulance Service NHS Trust merged into South East Coast Ambulance Service NHS Trust in 2006
 Sussex Weald and Downs NHS Trust merged into West Sussex Health and Social Care NHS Trust in 2002
 Swindon & Marlborough NHS Trust became Great Western Hospitals NHS Foundation Trust in 2008

T
 Tameside and Glossop Acute Services NHS Trust became Tameside Hospital NHS Foundation Trust in 2008
 Tameside and Glossop Community and Priority Services NHS Trust merged into Lancashire Care NHS Trust in 2001
 Tameside Hospital NHS Foundation Trust became Tameside and Glossop Integrated Care NHS Foundation Trust in 2017
 Taunton and Somerset NHS Foundation Trust merged into Somerset NHS Foundation Trust in 2020
 Teddington Memorial Hospital and Community NHS Trust dissolved 2001
 Tees & North East Yorkshire NHS Trust merged into Tees, Esk and Wear Valleys NHS Trust 2006
 Tees, East and North Yorkshire Ambulance Service NHS Trust merged (apart from Teesside) into Yorkshire Ambulance Service NHS Trust in 2006. The Tees locality merged into North East Ambulance Service NHS Trust
 Thames Gateway NHS Trust merged into West Kent National Health Service and Social Care Trust in 2002
 Thameside Community Health Care NHS Trust merged into South Essex Mental Health and Community Care NHS Trust in 2000
 Thameslink Healthcare Services NHS Trust merged into Thames Gateway NHS Trust in 1998
 Thanet Health Care NHS Trust merged into East Kent Hospitals NHS Trust in 1999
 Torbay and Southern Devon Health and Care NHS Trust was taken over by South Devon Healthcare NHS Foundation Trust to form Torbay and South Devon NHS Foundation Trust in October 2015
 Tower Hamlets Healthcare NHS Trust dissolved 2001
 Trafford Healthcare NHS Trust taken over by Central Manchester and Manchester Children's University Hospitals NHS Foundation Trust in 2012
 Trecare NHS Trust dissolved 1999
 Two Shires Ambulance NHS Trust merged into South Central Ambulance Service NHS Trust in 2006

U
 United Bristol Healthcare NHS Trust became University Hospitals Bristol NHS Foundation Trust in 2008
 United Leeds Teaching Hospitals NHS Trust merged into Leeds Teaching Hospitals NHS Trust in 1998
 Unityne Health NHS Trust merged into Newcastle City Health NHS Trust in 1994
 University Hospital Aintree NHS Trust became Aintree University Hospitals NHS Foundation Trust in 2006
 University Hospital of South Manchester NHS Foundation Trust merged into Manchester University NHS Foundation Trust 2017
 University Hospitals Bristol NHS Foundation Trust merged with Weston Area Health Trust in 2020 to form University Hospitals Bristol and Weston NHS Foundation Trust
 University Hospital of North Staffordshire NHS Trust merged into University Hospitals of North Midlands NHS Trust 2014

W
 Wakefield and Pontefract Community Health NHS Trust merged into South West Yorkshire Mental Health NHS Trust in 2002
 Walsall Community Health NHS Trust dissolved 2002
 Walsgrave Hospitals NHS Trust changed its name to University Hospitals Coventry and Warwickshire NHS Trust in 2000
 Wandsworth Community Health NHS Trust merged into South West London Community NHS Trust in 1999
 Warrington Hospital NHS Trust merged into North Cheshire Hospitals NHS Trust in 2001
 Warrington Community Health Care (NHS) Trust became 5 Boroughs Partnership NHS Foundation Trust in 2002
 Warwickshire Ambulance Service NHS Trust changed its name to Coventry and Warwickshire Ambulance NHS Trust in 2004
 Weald of Kent Community NHS Trust merged into Invicta Community Care NHS Trust in 1997
 Wellhouse NHS Trust merged into Barnet and Chase Farm NHS Hospitals Trust in 1999
 West Berkshire Priority Care NHS Trust merged into Berkshire Healthcare NHS Trust in 2000
 West Cheshire NHS Trust merged into Wirral and West Cheshire Community NHS Trust in 1997
 West Cumbria Health Care NHS Trust merged into North Cumbria Acute Hospitals NHS Trust in 2001
 West Dorset Community Health NHS Trust merged into Dorset Community NHS Trust in 1994
 West Dorset General Hospital NHS Trust became Dorset County Hospital NHS Foundation Trust in 2004
 West Dorset Mental Health NHS Trust merged into Dorset Community NHS Trust in 1994
 West Hampshire NHS Trust changed its name to Hampshire Partnership NHS Trust in 2004
 West Herts Community Health NHS Trust dissolved 2001
 West Kent National Health Service and Social Care Trust merged into Kent and Medway National Health Service and Social Care Partnership Trust in 2006
 West Lambeth Community Care NHS trust changed its name to Lambeth Healthcare NHS Trust in 1996
 West Lancashire NHS trust merged into Southport and Ormskirk Hospital NHS Trust in 1999
 West Lindsey NHS trust merged into merged into Lincoln District Healthcare NHS Trust 1999
 West London Healthcare NHS Trust merged into Brent, Kensington & Chelsea and Westminster Mental Health NHS Trust 1998
 West London Mental Health NHS Trust changed its name to West London NHS Trust in 2018
  West Middlesex University Hospital NHS Trust taken over by Chelsea and Westminster Hospital NHS Foundation Trust in September 2015
 West Sussex Health and Social Care NHS Trust merged into Sussex Partnership NHS Trust in 2006
 West Yorkshire Metropolitan Ambulance Service NHS Trust merged into Yorkshire Ambulance Service NHS Trust in 2006
 Westcountry Ambulance Services NHS Services merged into South Western Ambulance Service NHS Trust in 2006
 Western Sussex Hospitals NHS Foundation Trust  merged into University Hospitals Sussex NHS Foundation Trust in 2021
 Westmorland Hospitals NHS trust merged into Morecambe Bay Hospitals NHS Trust in 1998
 Weston Area Health NHS Trust; merged into University Hospitals Bristol and Weston NHS Foundation Trust in 2020
 Weston Park Hospital NHS Trust merged into Central Sheffield University Hospitals NHS Trust in 1999
 Weybourne Community NHS Trust merged into Bournewood Community and Mental Health Services Trust 1995
 Whipps Cross University Hospital NHS Trust merged with Barts Health NHS Trust 2012
 Wigan & Leigh Health Services NHS Trust merged into Wrightington, Wigan and Leigh NHS Trust in 2001
 Wiltshire Ambulance Service NHS Trust merged into Great Western Ambulance Service NHS Trust in 2006
 Wiltshire & Swindon Health Care NHS Trust dissolved in 2002
 Wiltshire Health Care NHS Trust merged into Wiltshire & Swindon Health Care NHS Trust in 1999
 Winchester & Eastleigh Healthcare NHS Trust was acquired by Basingstoke and North Hampshire NHS Foundation Trust in 2011
 Wirral & West Cheshire Community NHS Trust merged into Cheshire and Wirral Partnership NHS Trust in 2002
 Wolverhampton Healthcare NHS Trust became Royal Wolverhampton Hospitals NHS Trust in 2002
 Wolverley NHS Trust, Kidderminster, dissolved 1995
 Worcestershire Community and Mental Health NHS Trust
 Worcestershire Community Healthcare NHS Trust merged into Worcestershire Community and Mental Health NHS Trust in 2000
 Worcestershire Mental Health Partnership NHS Service merged into Worcestershire Health and Care NHS Trust in 2011
 Worthing and Southlands Hospitals NHS Trust merged into Western Sussex Hospitals NHS Foundation Trust in 2009
 Worthing Priority Care Services Trust merged into West Sussex Health and Social Care NHS Trust in 2002
 Wrightington Hospital NHS Trust merged into Wrightington, Wigan and Leigh NHS Foundation Trust

References

External links 
 

NHS Trusts

National Health Service (England)